Ali Mohammadlu may refer to:
 Ali Mohammadlu, Germi
 Ali Mohammadlu, Meshgin Shahr